Kaathadi ( Kite) is a 2018 Indian Tamil-language action film written and directed by Kalyaan. The film stars Avishek Karthik, Dhansika, and Baby Sathanya, with Daniel Annie Pope, Rajendran, Kaali Venkat, John Vijay, Kota Srinivasa Rao, and Sampath Raj in supporting roles. Featuring music composed by newcomers Pavan and Deepan, the film began production during August 2015 and was released in India on 23 February 2018.

Cast

Avishek Karthik as Sakthi
Dhansika as the Unnamed Heroine
Baby Sathanya as Anitha
Daniel Annie Pope as Thuppakki
Sampath Raj as Kathiresan 
Rajendran
Kaali Venkat as Muruga
John Vijay as Karthavarayan
Kota Srinivasa Rao as Seth
Manobala
V. S. Raghavan
Jangiri Madhumitha
Lollu Sabha Manohar as House Owner
Snehan
Mukzeeth
Singampuli
Vinodhini Vaidyanathan as Anitha's mother
Bava Lakshmanan

Production
Kalyaan, a former participant on the reality show Naalaiya Iyakkunar, began making his directorial debut film, Kaathadi, during October 2014. Sai Dhanshika was signed on to play a police officer, while Avishek Karthik, previously seen in Gautham Vasudev Menon's Vaaranam Aayiram (2008) and Nadunisi Naaygal (2011), was selected to portray the lead actor. Dhanshika suggested the makers chose her for the role because of her height, and partook in the action scenes without a stunt double. The film began production in late 2014 and was revealed to be in post-production by October 2015. The movie was shot extensively in Chennai, Kerala and Yelagiri hills. During the shoot at Vagamon in Kerala, a group of drunkards came to the spot and briefly caused trouble before Dhanshika helped halt the issue.

A long delay before the release of the film meant that two other films of Kalyaan, Katha Solla Porom (2016) and Gulaebaghavali (2018), were released before Kaathadi. Sai Dhanshika also gained further popularity between the end of production and the release of the film, following her appearance in the Rajinikanth-starrer Kabali (2016). In between, she also worked on Uru (2017), a film by Vicky Anand, who worked as an assistant to Kalyaan during the making of Kaathadi.

Release
The satellite rights of the film were sold to Vasanth TV.

Soundtrack

The film's music was composed by debutants R. Pavan and Deepan. The soundtrack was released on 3 June 2016 through Musik247.

References

External links 

2018 films
2010s Tamil-language films
Films shot in Andhra Pradesh
Films shot in Telangana